Maria Cino (born April 19, 1957) is an American public servant and political operative of the Republican Party. She served in the United States Department of Commerce and served as acting United States Secretary of Transportation during the George W. Bush administration.

Early life
Cino was born in Buffalo, New York on April 19, 1957. She grew up in Buffalo in an "Italian Catholic Democratic union household". Cino is a graduate of St. John Fisher College in Rochester, New York.

Career
Cino served as Chief of Staff for U.S. Representative Bill Paxon.

From 1993 to 1997, Cino served as the Executive Director and Chief Operating Officer of the National Republican Congressional Committee (NRCC), managing the organization's strategy, budget and daily operations. She helped lead the Republican Party to congressional victories in the 1994 election cycle.

In 1999 and 2000, Cino served as national political director for the presidential campaign of George W. Bush. She was also the RNC's deputy chair for political and congressional relations in 2000, and she served as RNC deputy chair in 2003 and 2004.

United States Department of Commerce
President George W. Bush appointed Cino to serve as assistant secretary and director general of the U.S. Foreign Commercial Service; in that capacity, "she supervised 1,700 employees and had a budget of $200 million".

United States Department of Transportation
Cino was nominated by President George W. Bush as the Deputy Secretary of Transportation on April 6, 2005, and was confirmed by the United States Senate on May 11, 2005.

After Norman Mineta's departure in July 2006, Cino served as acting United States Secretary of Transportation for a short time. Mary Peters was sworn in as Mineta's successor on September 30, 2006.

Later work
Cino served as president and chief executive officer of the 2008 Republican National Convention.

In December 2010, Cino announced her candidacy for chair of the Republican National Committee in the RNC's January 2011 election. The contest was won by Reince Priebus, and Cino finished third.

In 2012, Cino was appointed as Vice President of Americas and U.S. Government Relations for Hewlett Packard Enterprise. In 2020, Cino was named to The Hill's Top 100 Lobbyists list.

Board memberships
Cino has served as a board member of The WISH List, a group seeking to elect pro-choice Republican women. She considers herself "pro-life" (part of the United States anti-abortion movement) but she is also interested in increasing the numbers of Republican women holding office.

References

External links
 Maria Cino - Deputy Secretary of Transportation - Biography 

1957 births
American people of Italian descent
Living people
New York (state) Republicans
Politicians from Buffalo, New York
St. John Fisher College alumni
United States Department of Transportation officials
United States Deputy Secretaries of Transportation